The Last Kiss is a 1931 British Indian silent film, directed by Ambuj Gupta. The film was produced by the Dhaka Nawab Family and it is the first Bangladeshi film to be full-length. Shot in Dhaka, post-production work was done in Calcutta. The Last Kiss was released by the Mukul Theater. The film is considered lost.

The two actresses, Lolita and Charubala Devi, were brought from brothels in Dhaka. The film was sold to the Aurora Film Company of Calcutta.

Plot
The full plot of the film is unknown, and sources vary about it. Khaza Shahed said it was about a conflict between two family members. Khaza Zahir said the plot involved the hero's wife being kidnapped, and the hero subsequently finding her in the bedroom of the villain, leading to a fight in which both the hero and his wife die.

Cast 

 Khaza Azmal as a hero
 Khaza Nasrullah as a villain
 Lolita as the hero's wife
 Shailen Roy as the chief robber
 Khaza Adel as a landlord
 Khaza Zahir as a robber
 Syed Shahebe Alam as a police officer
 Charubala Devi as the landlord's wife
 Harimoti as a dancer and singer
 Khaza Shahed as a child actor
 Baby Tuntun as a child actor

Production 
In 1928, Ambuj Gupta, a sports coach at the Jagannath College, directed the silent film Sukumari. In October 1929, shortly after finishing that project, he started to work on The Last Kiss. It featured cinematography by Khaza Azad and Khaza Azmal. The 14-year-old lead actress, Lolita, was escorted from the Badamtoli brothel in Dhaka, and the supporting actress Charubala Devi was escorted from the Kumartuli brothel. The production was completely filmed in the eastern part of the (then) Bengal province of British India, and post-production concluded in Calcutta, India.

Title cards were displayed in three languages: Bengali, English, and Urdu. Gupta composed the title cards in the first two languages, and the Urdu titles were produced by Dr. W. H. Andalib Shadani. The Last Kiss is the first Bangladeshi film to be considered full-length. It was produced by the Royal Family.

Release 
The Last Kiss was released in 1931 in the Mukul Talkies (now the Azad Cinema). Ramesh Chandra Majumdar, a professor who attended the premiere, awarded two gold medals to Khaza Shahed and Baby Tuntun. In the same year, the only print of The Last Kiss' was bought by Aurora Film Company of Calcutta for distribution of the film. The film's print and negative are considered lost.

The cast and crew of the film were separated upon completing the film. The two actresses, Lolita and Charubala Devi, returned to their brothels, and director Ambuj Gupta emigrated to Calcutta.

Notes

References

External links 
 

1931 lost films
1931 films
Lost Indian films
Indian black-and-white films
1931 drama films
Indian drama films
Indian silent films
Dhaka Nawab family
Silent drama films